{{Speciesbox
| name = Yellow-bellied gerygone
| image = Pseudogerygone notata - The Birds of New Guinea (cropped) (cropped).jpg
| status = LC
| status_system = IUCN3.1
| status_ref = 
| genus = Gerygone
| species = chrysogaster
| authority = Gray, 1858
| subdivision_ranks = Subspecies
| subdivision_ref = 
| subdivision =
 'Gerygone chrysogaster neglecta - Wallace, 1865
 Gerygone chrysogaster notata - Salvadori, 1878
 Gerygone chrysogaster chrysogaster - Gray, GR, 1858
| synonyms = 
}}

The yellow-bellied gerygone (Gerygone chrysogaster'') is a species of bird in the family Acanthizidae.
It is found in New Guinea.
Its natural habitat is subtropical or tropical moist lowland forests.

References

Gerygone
Birds of New Guinea
Birds described in 1858
Taxa named by George Robert Gray
Taxonomy articles created by Polbot